South Arapahoe County was a county of the State of Colorado that existed for five months until it was renamed Arapahoe County in 1903.

History
In 1901, the Colorado General Assembly voted to split Arapahoe County into three parts:  a new consolidated City and County of Denver, a new Adams County, and the remainder of the Arapahoe County to be renamed South Arapahoe County.  A ruling by the Colorado Supreme Court, subsequent legislation, and a referendum delayed the reorganization until 1902-11-15.  On 1903-04-11, the Colorado General Assembly changed the name of South Arapahoe County back to Arapahoe County.

See also

Outline of Colorado
Index of Colorado-related articles
Historic Colorado counties
Arapahoe County, Kansas Territory
Arrappahoe County, Jefferson Territory
Arapahoe County, Colorado

References

Former counties of Colorado
Arapahoe County, Colorado

fr:Comté de South Arapahoe (Colorado)